Jasper Creek is a stream in Fresno and Monterey counties, California, in the United States.

Jasper Creek was named from the jasper buttes lining its banks.

See also
List of rivers of California

References

Rivers of Fresno County, California
Rivers of Monterey County, California
Rivers of Northern California